Tetrachloroethane may refer to either of two isomeric chemical compounds:

 1,1,1,2-Tetrachloroethane (R-130a)
 1,1,2,2-Tetrachloroethane (R-130)

See also
 Tetrachloroethene
 Trichloroethane
 Tetrafluoroethane
 Tetrabromoethane